Elena Lunda was an Italian actress. She was the daughter of Vittorio Lunda Gondola (Gundulić) from Ragusa/Dubrovnik. She appeared in 35 films between 1919 and 1928.

Selected filmography
 The Sphinx (1920)
 The Knot (1921)
 The Second Wife (1922)
 La Boheme (1923)
 The Redemption (1924)
 Take Care of Amelia (1925)
 Women You Rarely Greet (1925)
 Women Who Fall by the Wayside (1925)
 The Assmanns (1925)
 The Man on the Comet (1925)
 The Love Trap (1925)
 The Ride in the Sun (1926)
 The Giant of the Dolomites (1927)
 Company and the Crazy (1928)
 The Last Tsars (1928)
 Company and the Crazy (1928)

References

External links
 
Elena Lunda at Filmportal.de

Year of birth missing
Year of death missing
Italian film actresses
Italian silent film actresses
20th-century Italian actresses
Actresses from Palermo